James Joachim Nicholas MiD  (17 November 1890 – 20 September 1917) was an Australian rules footballer who played with University in the Victorian Football League. He was killed in action, in Belgium, during World War I.

Family
The son of William John Nicholas, and Sarah Nicholas, née Joachim, James Joachim Nicholas was born at Picola, Victoria on 17 November 1890.

Education
He was educated at Brighton Grammar School. In 1906, aged 15, he passed the matriculation examination.

He studied medicine at the University of Melbourne, graduating as Bachelor of Medicine and  Bachelor of Surgery (M.B.B.S.) in 1911, and as Doctor of Medicine (M.D.) in 1913.

Medicine
Following his graduation, and before his military service, he practised medicine jointly with Dr. Richard Horace Gibbs in Colac, Victoria.

Football
A regular player for the University's Metropolitan Amateur Football Association (MAFA) team, he played one VFL match for the University team, as a last minute inclusion in a team badly depleted in numbers, in the round 12 match, against Richmond Football Club, at the Melbourne Cricket Ground, on 8 July 1911.

Military service 
He served in the Australian Medical Corps during the First World War but was killed in action at the Menin Road Ridge, aged 26, on 20 September 1917, while serving at the Passchendaele front.

See also
 List of Victorian Football League players who died in active service

Footnotes

Sources
 Holmesby, Russell & Main, Jim (2007). The Encyclopedia of AFL Footballers. 7th ed. Melbourne: Bas Publishing.
 Australian War Memorial Roll of Honour: James Joachim Nicholas.
 World War One Service Record: Lieutenant Colonel James Joachim Nicholas, National Archives of Australia.
 World War One Nominal Roll: Lieutenant Colonel James Joachim Nicholas, Australian War Memorial.
 World War One Embarkation Roll: Captain James Joachim Nicholas, Australian War Memorial.

External links
 
 Lieutenant Colonel James Joachim Nicholas (photograph): Australian War Memorial.
 Captain James Joachim Nicholas (photograph): Australian War Memorial.
 The AIF Project: James Joachim Nicholas, UNSW Canberra.

1890 births
1917 deaths
People educated at Brighton Grammar School
Australian military personnel killed in World War I
Australian rules footballers from New South Wales
University Football Club players